Prunus amplifolia is a species of Prunus native to South America, including Bolivia, Peru and Venezuela. It goes by a number of common names, including jihuí and xoco in the Chakobo language.

References

amplifolia
Flora of Bolivia
Flora of Peru
Flora of Venezuela
Plants described in 1906